William John Donthorn (1799 – 18 May 1859) was a notable early 19th-century English architect, and one of the founders of what became the Royal Institute of British Architects (RIBA).

He was born in Swaffham, Norfolk and a pupil of Sir Jeffry Wyattville. He worked both in the Gothic and Classical styles, but is perhaps best known for his severe Greek Revival country houses, most of which have been demolished.

In 1834 he was one of several prominent architects to form the Institute of British Architects in London (later RIBA).

A large number of his drawings are in the RIBA drawings collection, now housed at the Victoria and Albert Museum.

Works

 Cromer Hall, Cromer, Norfolk, 1829
 Heronden Hall, Tenterden, Kent, 1846
 Elmham Hall, Norfolk (Demolished)
 Hillington Hall, Norfolk (Demolished)
 Watlington Hall, Norfolk (Demolished)
 Pickenham Hall, South Pickenham, Norfolk (Demolished). Between 1902 and 1905 architect Robert Weir Schultz extensively rebuilt and enlarged the hall, incorporating the previous house, in the Arts and Crafts style.
 improvements to Felbrigg Hall, Norfolk
 Upton Hall, near Southwell, Nottinghamshire
 Highcliffe Castle near Christchurch, Dorset (from 1830)
 workhouses in Ely (1837) and Wisbech (1838) (Cambridgeshire), Aylsham (1848-9) and Downham Market (Norfolk) and Oakham and Uppingham (Rutland)
 Sessions House, Peterborough (completed 1842)
 Holy Trinity Church, Upper Dicker, East Sussex (1843)
 the Leicester Monument at Holkham Hall,  erected in 1845–1848 in honour of Thomas Coke, 1st Earl of Leicester
 The Old Rectory, Dummer, near Basingstoke, Hampshire (1850)
 Home Farm, Marham, Norfolk (completed 1860). Gothic house with classical stables, all grade II listed.

References 

1799 births
1859 deaths
19th-century English architects
Architects from Norfolk
People from Swaffham